Sorin Dănuț Șerban (born 17 April 2000) is a Romanian professional footballer who plays as a left back for FCSB.

Club career

Șerban began his career at local club Viorel Mateianu, before moving to CS Mara Baia Mare in 2007. In 2012, he moved to Sporting Racea, before playing for CSS2 Baia Mare. In 2016, Șerban moved to Viitorul Ulmeni, playing for the club for two years, before signing for Unirea Dej.

Later in 2018, Șerban signed for Liga III club Minaur Baia Mare.

FCSB
On 31 July 2019, Șerban joined Liga I side FCSB. On 11 August 2019, he made his Liga I debut for FCSB in a 3–1 loss against Voluntari.

Politehnica Iași (loan)
After making only one appearance for FCSB, Șerban was loaned to fellow Liga I club Politehnica Iași, for the 2019–20 season.

International career
Șerban has represented Romania at youth level, making appearances for the under-18 and under-19 teams.

Career statistics

Club
Statistics accurate as of match played 8 December 2022.

References

External links
 
 Sorin Șerban at Statisticsfootball.com

2000 births
Living people
Sportspeople from Baia Mare
Romanian footballers
Romania youth international footballers
Association football defenders
CS Minaur Baia Mare (football) players
Liga I players
Liga III players
FC Steaua București players
FC Politehnica Iași (2010) players